Padha is a village in Karnal district, Haryana, India  with approximately 8,000 inhabitants

The main occupation is Kheti (Agriculture) and Pashupalan (cattle breeding). There is famous "Panch Thirath".

Villages in Karnal district